Shahzada Malekulashter Shujauddin is the third son of Mohammed Burhanuddin II, the 52nd Dai al-Mutlaq of Dawoodi Bohras, a branch of Tayyabi Mustaali Ismaili Shi'a Islam.

Personal life 
Malekulashter was born on 2 May 1948 (23 Jumada al-Thani 1367 ھ) to Mohammed Burhanuddin and Aaisaheba Amatullah.

Naqiyah, Shujauddin's daughter, is married to Husain Burhanuddin, the youngest son of Mufaddal Saifuddin. Naiqyah runs the Rawdat al-Quran School in South Bombay.

Career 

Shujauddin was one of the witnesses of private nass by Mohammed Burhanuddin, his father, on Mufaddal Saifuddin, his brother, in 2005 in London.

Shujauddin was appointed as one of the four rectors of Aljamea tus Saifiyah on 20 Rajab al-Asab 1439ھ corresponding to 5 April 2018 by Mufaddal Saifuddin, the 53rd Dai al-Mutlaq.

Shujauddin is the head of Tolaba ul-Kulliyat il-Mumenoon, a volunteer-run community-service organisation of Dawoodi Bohra students, established by his grandfather 51st Dai al-Mutlaq Taher Saifuddin. As of 2020, Tolaba has around 5000 members in 133 locations world-wide.

In recent years, Shujauddin has presided over Ashara Mubaraka sermons in Mumbai, Houston, Chicago, Kuwait and Karbala.

North America 

In 1978, Shujauddin visited the Bay Area for the first time as a representative of his father, Burhanuddin, to establish an official jamaat for the Dawoodi Bohra community.

In 1996, Shujauddin's father inaugurated Mohammedi Masjid and presided over Milad al Nabi in Houston. Since then, Shujauddin resides in Houston and made Houston as his second home, and leads the Dawoodi Bohra community of the United States. Apart from Houston, Shujauddin also frequently visits Dallas, San Antonio, Plano and New York City. 

In 2001, on invitation extended by Shujauddin, his father presided over Ashara Mubaraka in Houston. Over 10,000 Dawoodi Bohras from around the world gathered for the occasion. Later in 2015, Shujauddin's invitation for Ashara Mubaraka to be held at the newly renovated Mohammedi Masjid in Houston was accepted by his brother 53rd Dai al-Mutlaq, Mufaddal Saifuddin, and the event attracted around 25,000 members of the community from world over.

Notes

References 

1948 births
Living people
Dawoodi Bohras